Awaken is the debut mixtape by American singer-songwriter Keke Palmer. It was officially released on March 18, 2011 for downloads on mixtape-downloading websites. It has not been released as a digital download or as an album. Three of the songs appear on Palmer's debut album, So Uncool. The only single "The One You Call" was released on iTunes on January 8, 2011, and was sent to Urban radio the same day. A music video was also released for the song. It premiered on Palmer's official YouTube channel and iTunes.

Background 
Palmer released Awaken as a teaser of her upcoming new music, expected to be released in 2012. Palmer hoped that the mixtape would boost interest in her upcoming music. Three tracks from the mixtape appeared on her debut album, So Uncool: "The Game Song", "Bottoms Up" and "Keep it Movin'", each was released in 2007.

Promotion 
Palmer sang her song "Top of the World" at the 2009 Macy's Thanksgiving Day Parade on the Build-a-Bear Workshop float. Many of the songs were also leaked by Palmer on her official YouTube channel before the release of the mixtape.

Critical reception 
The reviews for Awaken are mostly positive, many complimenting Palmer's vocals, but questioning its ability to chart.

Peggy Oliver from The Urban Music Scene said "Palmer’s crystal voice is pleasing and soulful. As for the music on the Awaken Mixtape, the production is clean yet there are several auto tune spots and just so-so background vocals in certain places, which seem par for the course in today’s urban market. Thus, the question is not whether Palmer has very good vocal capabilities. It is a matter of whether her music at this point can stand toe to toe with the more prolific urban vocal talent hitting the charts today."

TerrellVanity.com also gave it a positive review saying that the tracks  "SuperJerkin", "Keke’s Love", "Hard To Breathe", and "The One you Call" were their favorite tracks. They also said that they could see "Get Out My Head" being played on the radio.

Track listing

The One You Call 

"The One You Call" is the only single released from Keke Palmer's first mixtape Awaken. The song was released December 7, 2010. On January 27, 2011 the song was sent to urban radio. The official music video was released November 23, 2010 and all expenses for the video were paid by Palmer. Due to lack of promotion and radio airplay, the song failed to chart anywhere, unlike her previous single, which charted on the "Portugal Singles Top 50" chart at number 30. It was only played 272 times on the US radio, during 2010.

Music video 
The official music video was released November 23, 2010. It was directed by Gabe Evans and Ryan Parma. The video shows the singer hanging out with her friends while Palmer's love interest starts calling and texting her on her phone. However, she knows that he just broke up with his girlfriend and now he's going through his phone to see who will pick up.

Scratch That DJ Contest 
On February 20, 2011 Palmer started a contest called the "Scratch That DJ Contest". Palmer started the contest to find a DJ that could travel with her for her upcoming tour. To enter the contest the DJ must create a new version of Palmer's single "The One You Call". On March 6, 2011 Palmer released an a cappella version of the song on her official YouTube channel.

References 

2011 mixtape albums
Keke Palmer albums